The men's canoe sprint C-2 1,000 metres at the 2016 Olympic Games in Rio de Janeiro took place between 19 and 20 August at Lagoa Stadium. The medals were presented by Bernard Rajzman, IOC member, Brazil and Jens Perlwitz, Board Member of the ICF.

Competition format
The competition comprised heats, semifinals, and a final round.

Schedule

All times are Brasilia Time (UTC-03:00)

Results

Heats

Heat 1

Heat 2

Semifinals

Semifinal 1

Semifinal 2

Finals

Final B

Final A

References

Canoeing at the 2016 Summer Olympics
Men's events at the 2016 Summer Olympics